Daniel Bellemare (born January 17, 1980) is a Canadian former competitive figure skater. He represented Canada at three World Junior Championships and reached the final segment at all three competitions. His best result, fourth, came at the 1997 Junior Worlds in Seoul, South Korea.

Programs

Competitive highlights

References 

1980 births
Canadian male single skaters
Living people
Sportspeople from Longueuil